VRA may refer to:

Government
 Voting Rights Act of 1965, a piece of federal legislation in the United States
 Video Recordings Act 1984, a piece of United Kingdom legislation
 Volta River Authority, the government agency in the Republic of Ghana responsible for the generation and supply of electricity
 Voluntary restraint agreement, an agreement to limit exports

Organizations
 Visual Resources Association, a library association for image media professionals
 Volunteer Railroaders Association, a New Jersey-based non-profit group of volunteers
 Volunteer Rescue Association, in NSW, Australia

Other uses
 VRA, IATA airport code for Juan Gualberto Gómez Airport, Varadero, Cuba
 Vrå, Hjørring, Denmark
 VRA Amsterdam, a Dutch cricket club based in Amstelveen
 VRA Cricket Ground, a cricket ground in Amstelveen, used by the Dutch national side